Emilson Dantas (born 19 March 1964) is a Brazilian weightlifter. He competed at the 1988 Summer Olympics, the 1992 Summer Olympics and the 1996 Summer Olympics.

References

External links
 

1964 births
Living people
Brazilian male weightlifters
Olympic weightlifters of Brazil
Weightlifters at the 1988 Summer Olympics
Weightlifters at the 1992 Summer Olympics
Weightlifters at the 1996 Summer Olympics
Place of birth missing (living people)